"Argentine Melody (Cancion de Argentina)" is an instrumental tune composed by Andrew Lloyd Webber as the BBC theme music for the 1978 FIFA World Cup held in Argentina that same year. Released as a single in the UK in June 1978, this instrumental piece peaked at position #14 on the UK Singles Chart. It was performed by San Jose featuring Rodriguez Argentina (a.k.a. Rod Argent), who would also go on to perform the instrumental tune "Aztec Gold" eight years later for the 1986 FIFA World Cup in Mexico(ITV theme)

Chart history

See also
FIFA World Cup official songs

References

1978 singles
Songs with music by Andrew Lloyd Webber
1978 songs
MCA Records singles